USS Blue Jacket is a name used more than once by the U.S. Navy:

 , a C2-S-B1 type freighter as laid down 23 October 1941 at Oakland, California.
 USS Blue Jacket, a landlocked destroyer replica used to train recruits between 1968 and 1993 at Naval Training Center Orlando in Florida.

See also
 Bluejacket (disambiguation), for merchant ships and other naval ships with this name

References

United States Navy ship names
Landlocked ships